Vermont Woman, a monthly newspaper, was published in South Hero, Vermont. Its circulation was 10,000.

History 
The founder and publisher of Vermont Woman, a monthly newspaper, was Suzanne (Sue) Gillis.  Gillis financially backed the paper. In 1990, the paper was shut down due to financial challenges. Gillis then went on to become the founding publisher for the community weekly newspaper, Vermont Times. In 1995, Gillis became the founding publisher of the award-winning community weekly, Provincetown Banner. Thirteen years later, in 2003, Vermont Woman was re-launched by Gillis. The paper has since won a number of awards, including the New England Newspapers and Publishers Association's designation of New England Newspaper of the Year in 2007, 2008, and in 2011.

In 2010, Gillis was inducted in the New England Newspapers Hall of Fame for her commitment to independent publishing and for providing a forum for women's voices and perspectives.  Rickey Gard Diamond, was the first editor of the paper, which launched in 1985 with 44 pages and an initial circulation of 20,000. In 2012, long-time editor Rickey Gard Diamond and Vermont Woman, won a national award from the National Newspapers Association, 3rd place in the category of Best Investigative or In-Depth Story or Series, Non-daily Division, circulation 10,000 or more.

Vermont Woman published its final issue on September 9, 2019.

Vermont Woman hosted a lecture series from 1986 to 2009. This series featured speakers like Ann Richards, Valerie Plame Wilson, Gloria Steinem, and Helen Thomas.

Vermont Woman Speaker Series 

Videos are courtesy of CCTV Archives, CCTV Center for Media & Democracy.

Awards

New England Newspapers and Publishers Association Awards

References 

Newspapers published in Vermont